Hercules is a 1958 Italian sword-and-sandal film based upon the Hercules and the Quest for the Golden Fleece myths.  The film stars Steve Reeves as the titular hero and Sylva Koscina as his love interest Princess Iole. Hercules was directed by Pietro Francisci and produced by Federico Teti. The film spawned a 1959 sequel, Hercules Unchained, that also starred Reeves and Koscina.

Cast

 Steve Reeves as Hercules
 Sylva Koscina as Iole
 Fabrizio Mioni as Jason
 Ivo Garrani as Pelias, King of Iolcus
 Gianna Maria Canale as Antea, Queen of the Amazons
 Arturo Dominici as Eurysteus
 Mimmo Palmara as Iphitus, son of Pelias
 Lidia Alfonsi as The Sibyl
 Gabriele Antonini as Ulysses
 Aldo Fiorelli as Argos
 Andrea Fantasia as Laertes

 Luciana Paluzzi as Iole's maid as Luciana Paoluzzi
 Afro Poli as Chiron
 Gian Paolo Rosmino as Aesculapius
 Willi Colombini as Pollux
 Fulvio Carrara as Castor
 Gino Mattera as Orpheus
 Gina Rovere as Amazon
 Lily Granado as Amazon
 Aldo Pini as Tifi
 Guido Martufi as Iphitus, as a child
 Paola Quattrini as Iole, as a child

Production
The film was shot in Eastmancolor, using the French widescreen process Dyaliscope. An American Bison served as the Cretan Bull.

The roar sound effects of the creature (at the end of the film, guarding the Golden Fleece) is taken from Godzilla (1954 film).

Distribution
Hercules was released in Italy on 20 February 1958.

American producer Joseph E. Levine acquired the U.S. distribution rights to the film and Warners advanced Levine $300,000 for the privilege of distributing the film in the US. The film opened at the Hippodrome Theatre in Baltimore on 26 June 1959. It had an intensive promotional campaign costing  and a then-wide release of 550 theatres.

It premiered in England on 18 May 1959 and in Spain on 23 November 1959. In 1961 Levine and Warner Bros. reissued a double feature of Hercules and Attila (1954) with the tagline The Mightiest Men in All the World...The Mightiest Show in All the World.

Box office
In Europe, the film sold 5,838,816 tickets in Italy, 2,917,106 tickets in France, and 2,373,000 tickets in Germany.

Upon its North American release at the Hippodrome Theatre in Baltimore, it set a house record with $30,000 in its first week. Hercules became a major box-office hit. In 1959, it earned  from distributor rentals in the United States and Canada. The film went on to earn  in rentals from  ticket sales in North America.

In the Soviet Union, where it released in 1966, the film sold  tickets. This adds up to  tickets sold worldwide.

Merchandise
In America, the film generated a Dell comic book adaptation with illustrations by John Buscema and a 33 RPM long-playing RCA Victor recording of the film's soundtrack.

Mystery Science Theater 3000 episode
The Mystery Science Theater 3000 presentation of the movie, episode #502, was first aired on 18 December 1993, on Comedy Central. The MST3K presentation edited the original movie to fit the TV show's time constraints, which causes Hercules'''s characters to go from "the midst of one plot development before the commercial ... [to] somewhere else entirely" afterwards.

Although two other MST3K episodes featuring Hercules movies (Hercules Against the Moon Men, at No. 49, and Hercules Unchained, at No. 61) were ranked in the Top 100 list of episodes as voted upon by MST3K Season 11 Kickstarter backers, Hercules did not make the cut. In his rankings of all 191 MST3K episodes, however, writer Jim Vorel ranked the episode #78, the highest of the four  Hercules movies that aired on Comedy Central. "It’s a mish-mash of Greek myth," Vorel writes, that is "the most purely entertaining film in the series. ... The total abject devotion of all the other men toward Hercules is naturally hilarious."

The MST3K version of Hercules was included as part of the Mystery Science Theater 3000, Volume XXXII DVD collection, released by Shout! Factory on 24 March 2015. The other episodes in the four-disc set include Space Travelers (episode #401), Radar Secret Service (episode #520), and San Francisco International'' (episode #614).

Biography

References

External links

 New York Times Tribute to Steve Reeves Retrieved 29 August 2008.
 

1958 films
1950s fantasy films
1950s historical films
Films about Heracles
Films set in Greece
Films about the Argonauts
Films directed by Pietro Francisci
Films set in ancient Greece
Films set in the Mediterranean Sea
Italian fantasy adventure films
1950s Italian-language films
Peplum films
Films adapted into comics
Films about dragons
Lux Film films
Historical fantasy films
Sword and sandal films
Films scored by Enzo Masetti
Works based on the Argonautica
Iolcus in fiction
1950s Italian films